Lepanthes pteropogon is a species of orchid found from Colombia to El Salvador.

References

External links 

pteropogon
Orchids of Colombia
Orchids of El Salvador